Stomoplo or Stamopolu, also known as "The Crocodile Island", is a bay on which the town of Primorsko is situated, on the southern coast of the Thracian Black Sea, in the Burgas Province of Bulgaria.

It is a destination for divers and spearfishermen. The lagoon is rich in fish and has a varied flora and fauna.

References 

Bulgarian Black Sea Coast
Landforms of Burgas Province
Bays of Bulgaria